Pablo Meana (born June 10, 1975 in Necochea) is a male  volleyball player from Argentina, who played as a libero. He ended up in sixth place with the Men's National Team at the 2002 FIVB Men's World Championship, where he was named Best Receiver of the tournament. Meana is a two-time Olympian (2000 and 2004) for his native country.

Awards

Individuals
 2002 FIVB World Championship "Best Receiver"

References

External links
FIVB Profile

1975 births
Living people
Argentine men's volleyball players
Olympiacos S.C. players
Volleyball players at the 2000 Summer Olympics
Volleyball players at the 2004 Summer Olympics
Olympic volleyball players of Argentina
Sportspeople from Buenos Aires Province